Goaria is a Marwari Rajasthani language spoken by some 25,000 people in Sindh Province, Pakistan. The people are predominantly Hindu, and use the Hindi language for worship.

References 

Hindi languages
Languages of Sindh
Languages of Rajasthan